Pterostylis elegans, commonly known as the elegant greenhood, is a species of orchid endemic to New South Wales. Non-flowering plants have a rosette of leaves flat on the ground but flowering plants have a single translucent white and dark green flower with reddish-brown markings near the tip.

Description
The flower is translucent white with dark green lines and markings. The dorsal sepal and petals are fused, forming a hood or "galea" over the column and which are reddish-brown near their ends. Flowering occurs from January to April.

Taxonomy and naming
Pterostylis elegans was first formally described in 1997 by David Jones from a specimen collected in the Enfield State Forest on the Northern Tablelands. The description was published in The Orchadian. The specific epithet (elegans) is a Latin word meaning "tasteful", "choice", "fine" or "select".

Distribution and habitat
The elegant greenhood grows between grasses and small shrubs in woodland and forest between the Barrington Tops National Park and Walcha.

Conservation
Pterostylis elegans is listed as "vulnerable" under the New South Wales Threatened Species Conservation Act 1995. The main threats to the species are weed invasion, feral pig activity and cattle grazing.

References

elegans
Endemic orchids of Australia
Orchids of New South Wales
Plants described in 1997